Stephen Furst (born Stephen Nelson Feuerstein; May 8, 1954 – June 16, 2017) was an American actor. After gaining attention with his featured role as Kent "Flounder" Dorfman in the comedy film National Lampoon's Animal House and its spin-off television series Delta House,
he went on to be a regular as Dr. Elliot Axelrod in the medical drama series St. Elsewhere from 1983 to 1988, and as Centauri diplomatic attaché Vir Cotto in the science fiction series Babylon 5 from 1994 to 1998. Other notable film roles included the college comedy Midnight Madness (1980), as a team leader in an all-night mystery game, the action thriller Silent Rage (1982), as deputy to a sheriff played by Chuck Norris, and the comedy The Dream Team (1989), as a good-natured psychiatric patient.

Early life
Born Stephen Nelson Feuerstein in Norfolk, Virginia, on May 8, 1954, Furst attended Virginia Commonwealth University.

Career

As actor

Furst worked as a pizza delivery driver while looking for acting jobs in the mid-1970s, and included his head shot in pizza boxes. After Matty Simmons saw his photo, Furst was cast as Kent "Flounder" Dorfman in National Lampoon's Animal House (1978), reprising the role in the short-lived 1979  spin-off ABC sitcom Delta House, and repeating his famous line, "Oh boy, is this great!", as a school principal with a personality mirroring Flounder's in the music video for Twisted Sister's "I Wanna Rock."

Other roles include "Junior" Keller (the unseen) in the 1980 horror movie The Unseen, Gonzer in the 1984 feature film Up the Creek, Dr. Elliot Axelrod in the television series St. Elsewhere (1983–1988), and Vir Cotto in the science fiction television series Babylon 5 (1994–1998). Furst was amused by the report that North Korean dictator Kim Jong Un modeled his haircut after Furst's character in Babylon 5.

In 1979 he starred as an overweight high school tuba player coerced onto the wrestling team in Kieth Merrill's feel-good underdog film, Take Down. In 1980, he played the character of Harold in the movie, Midnight Madness. Furst appeared in 1982 in an episode of Newhart called "Sprained Dreams" where he played a Dartmouth College student. In 1983, he also appeared in a supporting role as Aldo in the provocative ABC TV movie The Day After. In 1989, he played the character of Albert Ianuzzi in the film The Dream Team.

In 1983, Furst also appeared alongside Erik Estrada, Tom Reilly, and Heather O'Rourke in an episode of CHiPs titled "Fun House" as a student who belonged to the college fraternity "DDT."

In the 1995 animated TV series Freakazoid!, he voiced the character Fanboy. Also in 1995, he took a hiatus from Babylon 5 to star in a short-lived TV series, Misery Loves Company. In 1997, he played Derby Ferris in Little Bigfoot 2: The Journey Home. He also voiced a young Colonel Hathi in Season 2 of Disney's Jungle Cubs, had a starring voice role as Booster in the 2000 series Buzz Lightyear of Star Command and its direct-to-video prequel Buzz Lightyear of Star Command: The Adventure Begins and also voiced a hulky walrus named Dash in the 2000 Disney movie The Little Mermaid II: Return to the Sea. He starred in Magic Kid and its sequel.

In 2002, he guest starred in an episode of Scrubs. In the same year, he was cast as Walter Nichols in the unaired pilot of the Nickelodeon television series Drake & Josh, but his identity was unknown in visuals, until his name was revealed in a YouTube video from 2017. He was replaced by Jonathan Goldstein prior to the series' debut, due to his unavailability for future episodes.

As director
Furst began directing with three episodes of Babylon 5; two in the fourth season and one in the fifth. Furst directed many independent and/or low-budget movies, including the 2001 film Title to Murder, starring Christopher Atkins and Maureen McCormick, and the direct-to-video children's movie Baby Huey's Great Easter Adventure. He also directed three low-budget movies for the Sci Fi Channel: Dragon Storm in 2004, Path of Destruction in 2005, and Basilisk: The Serpent King in 2006; he also co-starred in the last two films.

As producer
Furst produced My Sister's Keeper, based on the Jodi Picoult novel, starring Cameron Diaz and Alec Baldwin. He produced other several films under his production company Curmudgeon Films. Atomic Shark aired in August 2016 on Syfy, during "Sharknado Week". Christmas in Homestead premiered on the Hallmark Channel during the holiday season of 2016. Cold Moon, a psychological thriller based on the Michael McDowell book, is set for a theatrical release in October 2017 in the United States. Cold Moon won "Best Horror Film" at the 2016 Laughlin Film Festival.

2016 criticism of the Academy of Motion Picture Arts and Sciences
Furst wrote a letter, later published in Variety, criticizing the Academy's portrayal of its own members as racist and resistant to diversity and suggested the Academy's response to the 2016 #OscarsSoWhite was ageist and sexist. He suggested that most members of the Academy do not watch the films nominated for awards, and that the Academy should start by ensuring those who vote have watched the films.

Personal life
Furst was married to entertainment lawyer Lorraine Wright from 1976 until his death. The couple had two sons, both of whom are in the entertainment business. His older son Nathan (born 1978) is a television and film composer, while his younger son Griff (born 1981) is an actor, director and musician.

Both of Furst's parents died from complications of diabetes. Shortly after his father's death, Furst, too, was diagnosed with type 2 diabetes at age 17. He reached a weight of 320 pounds and had uncontrolled type 2 diabetes by the age of 40. After almost needing to have his left foot amputated due to diabetes complications in 1996, Furst reduced his weight from 260 lbs to 175 lbs.

Starting in June 2006, Furst co-hosted the Renal Support Network's webcast "KidneyTalk" with Lori Hartwell. He became a spokesperson for the American Diabetes Association and authored the book Confessions of a Couch Potato. As a celebrity spokesperson for the American Heart Association, Furst said, "I thought I was more powerful than the disease of diabetes, but in reality, I was letting it take control of me. Now, I've decided to take control of my life."

Death
On June 16, 2017, Furst died from complications related to diabetes at his home in Moorpark, California, at the age of 63.

Selected filmography

 American Raspberry (1977) – Fat Gin Player
 The Bastard (1978) – Bertrand
 National Lampoon's Animal House (1978) – Kent Dorfman
 Take Down (1979) – Randy Jensen
 Swim Team (1979) – Bear
 Scavenger Hunt (1979) – Merle
 Midnight Madness (1980) – Harold – Blue Team Leader
 The Unseen (1980) – 'Junior' Keller (The Unseen)
 Getting Wasted (1980) – Marshall
 Silent Rage (1982) – Charlie
 National Lampoon's Class Reunion (1982) – Hubert Downs
 The Day After (1983) – Aldo
 Up the Creek (1984) – Gonzer
 Off Sides (Pigs vs. Freaks) (1984) – Steamboat
 The Dream Team (1989) – Albert Ianuzzi
 Murder, She Wrote (1990) - Sgt. Paulsen
 Magic Kid (1993) – Bob Ryan
 Magic Kid 2 (1994) – Uncle Bob
 Babylon 5 (1994-1998) - Vir Cotto
 Howie Mandel's Sunny Skies (1995)
 Goldilocks and the Three Bears (1995) – Hawkins
 Cops n Roberts (1995)
 Freakazoid! (1995) - Fanboy (voice)
 Road Rovers (1996) - Sport (voice)
 Little Bigfoot 2: The Journey Home (1998) – Derby Ferris
 Everything's Jake (1999) – Assistant Librarian
 Baby Huey's Great Easter Adventure (1999) – Baby Huey (voice), Phantoms' Manager
 Deadly Delusions (1999)
 Buzz Lightyear of Star Command: The Adventure Begins (2000) - Booster (voice)
 The Little Mermaid II: Return to the Sea (2000) – Dash (voice)
 Title to Murder (2001) – Oscar, the Security Guard
 Echoes of Enlightenment (2001) – House Foreclosure Client
 Drake & Josh (2002) – Walter Nichols (unaired pilot)
 Sorority Boys (2002) – The Alum
 Searching for Haizmann (2002) – Dr. Gaulforid
 Going Greek (2003)
 Roomies (2004) – Mr. Nossee
 Seven Days of Grace (2006) – Henry Henary III

 John Belushi: Dancing on the Edge (2010) – Himself

References

External links

 
 

1954 births
2017 deaths
20th-century American male actors
21st-century American male actors
Actors from Norfolk, Virginia
Actors from Virginia
American male film actors
American male television actors
American male voice actors
American television directors
Deaths from diabetes
Film directors from Virginia
Male actors from Virginia
People from Norfolk, Virginia
Virginia Commonwealth University alumni